The 2013 North Carolina Central Eagles football team represented North Carolina Central University in the 2013 NCAA Division I FCS football season. They were led by interim head coach Dwayne Foster after former coach Henry Frazier, III was fired following a domestic dispute on August 22, 2013. The Eagles played their home games at O'Kelly–Riddick Stadium. They were a member of the Mid-Eastern Athletic Conference. They finished the season 5–7, 3–5 in MEAC play to finish in a tie for eighth place.

Schedule

Source: Schedule

References

North Carolina Central
North Carolina Central Eagles football seasons
North Carolina Central Eagles football